Nolan Hill is a residential neighbourhood in the northwest quadrant of Calgary, Alberta, Canada. Located near the north edge of the city, it is bounded by Sarcee Trail to the west, 144 Avenue N.W. to the north, the Sage Hill community across Shaganappi Trail to the east, and the Sherwood community across 128 Avenue N.W. to the south. It is one of five communities located within the Symons Valley area.

Nolan Hill is located within Calgary City Council's Ward 2.

Demographics 
In the City of Calgary's 2016 municipal census, Nolan Hill had a population of 3,756 living in 1,583 dwellings, a change of   since recording a population of 1,723 in 2015.

See also 
List of neighbourhoods in Calgary

References 

Neighbourhoods in Calgary